Bulilimamangwe District is a district in Zimbabwe.

Location
The district is located in Matabeleland South Province, in southwestern Zimbabwe, close to the international border with Botswana.

Overview
Bulilimamangwe is the name which was used long ago before the year 2000. The current districts are Bulilima and Mangwe separated by the railway line which cuts across Plumtree town.  The district headquarters is located in Plumtree, a border town with an estimated population of 2,150 as of 2004.

Population
The current population of Bulilimamangwe District is not publicly known. The next national population census in Zimbabwe is scheduled from 18 August 2012 through 28 August 2012.

See also
 Districts of Zimbabwe
 Provinces of Zimbabwe

References

 
Districts of Matabeleland South Province